Matthew James Canavan (born 17 December 1980) is an Australian politician. He was elected to the Australian Senate representing the state of Queensland at the 2013 federal election for the term beginning 1 July 2014. He won re-election at the 2016 election and again at the 2022 Australian federal election. He was the Minister for Resources and Northern Australia between February 2016 and February 2020. He is a member of the Liberal National Party and sits with National Party in federal parliament.

In July 2017, amid the 2017–18 Australian parliamentary eligibility crisis, Canavan resigned from Cabinet over doubt as to his eligibility to be a member of the parliament, after discovering that he might be an Italian citizen. Section 44(i) of the Australian Constitution prohibits election of dual citizens to the Parliament of Australia.  Italian constitutional experts were unable to advise with certainty whether he had inherited Italian citizenship, but the High Court found on 27 October 2017 that Canavan was not an Italian citizen and therefore was not ineligible under s 44(i). He was reappointed to the Cabinet on the same day.

In February 2020, Canavan resigned again from Cabinet to support Barnaby Joyce in his unsuccessful bid for National Party leadership.

Early life 
Canavan was born in Southport on the Gold Coast, Queensland. He is of Italian descent; his mother's parents were born in Lozzo di Cadore, in the Italian province of Belluno. His father Bryan worked as a manager at Woolworths and sales representative with Nestlé, while his mother Maria worked as a teller with the Commonwealth Bank. His brother John is a mining executive, and managing director of Winfield Energy, which had a significant interest in the Rolleston coal mine until 2020.

Canavan grew up in Slacks Creek in the City of Logan. He attended Chisholm Catholic College, where he was active in Edmund Rice Camps. While at University, Canavan identified as a communist until a political disagreement with volunteers for the International Socialist Organisation. He holds the degrees of Bachelor of Arts and Bachelor of Economics (Hons.) from the University of Queensland. After graduating from university he moved to Canberra to work at the Productivity Commission. He was a senior research economist (2003–2008) and later director (2009–2010), briefly moving to Brisbane as a senior executive at KPMG (2008–2009). From 2010 to 2013 Canavan served as chief of staff to Senator Barnaby Joyce, at the time serving as shadow minister for finance. He later turned down an offer to move to Andrew Robb's office, despite Joyce's demotion to a less senior portfolio.

Political career

Canavan was elected to the Australian Senate as a member of the Liberal National Party of Queensland, representing Queensland at the 2013 federal election for the term beginning 1 July 2014. He sits with the National Party in the Senate, although he had been a member of the Liberal club during his latter days at UQ.

In the First Turnbull Ministry, Canavan served as the Minister for Northern Australia between 18 February and 19 July 2016. He was the first member of cabinet born in the 1980s.

With the reelection of the Turnbull Government in 2016, Canavan was elevated into Cabinet becoming the Minister for Resources and Northern Australia in the Second Turnbull Ministry. He briefly resigned from the Cabinet between July and October 2016 amid his High Court citizenship challenge.

On 3 February 2020, he resigned again from Cabinet to support Barnaby Joyce in his unsuccessful bid for National Party leadership. He also cited his failure to declare his membership of the North Queensland Cowboys, as the Northern Australia Infrastructure Facility within his Northern Australia portfolio, approved a $20 million loan for the Cowboys to build a training centre next to the North Queensland Stadium in Townsville. He denied it was a breach of ministerial standards as under the North Australia Infrastructure Facility Act, he had no power to approve loans but could only reject them.

After his resignation from the Cabinet, he remained as deputy leader of the Nationals in the Senate, along with Bridget McKenzie as leader, as the other 3 Nationals senators were first-termers.

Canavan has served on the "Inquiry into the destruction of 46,000 year old caves at the Juukan Gorge in the Pilbara region of Western Australia", which delivered its interim report in December 2020.

High Court citizenship challenge (2017) 

Canavan's mother had registered him as an "Italian resident abroad" with the Italian consulate in Brisbane in 2006. Canavan stated that he had been unaware of this until his mother had informed him of it following the resignation of two Greens senators over their dual citizenship. The government took the view that he was not in breach of the Constitution, as the registration had not been made with his knowledge or consent.

Initially, Canavan accepted that he had Italian citizenship. He then renounced it, effective 8 August 2017. On the same day, on a government motion with all-party support, the Senate resolved to refer the matters of Senators Scott Ludlam, Larissa Waters and Canavan to the High Court as Court of Disputed Returns. The Attorney-General indicated that the Commonwealth would argue, in favour of Cavanan, that s 44(i) requires a personal acknowledgement of the connection, which had not occurred.  Canavan spoke in support of the referral, while stating that he did not believe he was in breach of s 44(i), and said that he would not be voting in the Senate until his position was determined by the Court. Later, four other members of the federal parliament were referred to the High Court, which heard the seven cases together.

In the High Court, government lawyers argued for Canavan and others that s 44(i) requires some personal acknowledgement of another citizenship, which had not occurred; in its judgment on 27 October 2017, the Court rejected this interpretation of the sub-section.  For Canavan, it was argued in addition that his registration as an "Italian resident abroad" in 2006 had been incorrect in supposing that he was an Italian citizen and that, although a change in Italian citizenship law when he had been two years old could appear to have conferred Italian citizenship upon him, it could not be shown to have done so. The Court accepted these points and held that Canavan had never been a citizen of Italy; accordingly, he had been validly elected.

Political views 
Canavan opposes same-sex marriage. In 2017, when Cory Bernardi moved a motion to ban abortion on gender grounds, Canavan was one of ten MPs who voted for the motion, which was defeated with 36 votes against.

Canavan is a climate change denier and a prominent supporter of fossil fuels, particularly coal, and has strongly opposed investment in renewable energy. He has been referred to as one of the major players in the LNP split over climate and energy policy, frequently advocating for more coal power plants, despite their higher costs and higher emissions than alternative energies. Canavan has rejected that climate change contributed to the catastrophic 2019–20 Australian bushfire season, despite evidence to the contrary. His views have been rebuked by climate scientists and other members of Parliament, including Nationals MP Darren Chester. In response to a protest in November 2018 where high school students walked out of class to protest the Australian government's inaction on climate change, he responded "I want kids to be at school to learn about how you build a mine, how you do geology, how you drill for oil and gas". He also stated "The best thing you'll learn about going to a protest is how to join the dole queue." He also strongly opposes the teaching of climate change in schools, stating that children are "more interested in PewDiePie than politics", "Fortnite than fostering revolution" and that the only mining they get involved in is in Minecraft.

Many of Canavan's comments have been characterised as racist, or racially charged. In October 2020, he shared a picture on Facebook and Twitter that showed a vehicle with a sticker that stated "Black Coal Matters" on it, intended as a parody of the American social movement Black Lives Matter. This was posted in the wake of major racial tension following the murder of George Floyd, and Canavan was met with heavy backlash on social media. He later defended the post as a "joke", and declared that the Black Lives Matter movement deserves "ridicule". In August 2021, Canavan received widespread criticism when he took issue with the announcement that the children's entertainment group the Wiggles had recruited a further four members, who were ethnically diverse, a move he perceived as "woke", saying in an interview with The Australian newspaper: "The Wiggles are free to do what they like. It was nice while it lasted. But you go woke, you go broke." His comments were perceived by some as racially insensitive.

In November 2021, Canavan was one of five Coalition senators who crossed the floor to vote for Pauline Hanson's proposed COVID-19 Vaccination Status (Prevention of Discrimination) Bill 2021, which would have prevented people who willingly refused the COVID-19 vaccine from being subject to any kind of mandate or consequence. His support of the bill drew criticism and accusations of being anti-vaccine. Canavan called for the rollout of the AstraZeneca vaccine to be halted, contrary to the policy of his own government and views of his colleagues.

Canavan has spread misinformation linking COVID vaccination to excess deaths in Australia.

Personal life
Canavan met his wife, Andrea, at university while volunteering with Edmund Rice Camps. As of 2017, they had five children together and lived in Yeppoon. They also own a property in Barmaryee and a house in Macquarie, Australian Capital Territory.

Canavan has said he "rediscovered" his Roman Catholic faith while preparing for his wedding.

References

External links
 
 

1980 births
Australian economists
Australian monarchists
Government ministers of Australia
Liberal National Party of Queensland members of the Parliament of Australia
Living people
Members of the Australian Senate
Members of the Australian Senate for Queensland
Members of the Cabinet of Australia
Turnbull Government
University of Queensland alumni
21st-century Australian politicians
Australian politicians of Italian descent
Morrison Government
Australian conspiracy theorists